Alexander Chisholm may refer to:
Alexander Chisholm (Upper Canada politician) (1790–1854), political figure in Upper Canada
Alexander Chisholm (artist) (1792–1847), Scottish artist
Alexander Chisholm, a citizen of South Carolina in the 1790s in Chisholm v. Georgia
Alexander Hugh Chisholm (1890–1977), Australian journalist, newspaper editor, author and amateur ornithologist
Alexander William Chisholm (Canadian politician) (1869–1939), physician and political figure in Nova Scotia, Canada
Alexander Chisholm (priest) (1887–1975), Archdeacon of Carlisle
Alexander Chisholm (MP), British Member of Parliament for Inverness-shire
Lex Chisholm (1915–1981), Canadian ice hockey centre in the NHL